The Indonesian short-nosed fruit bat (Cynopterus titthaecheilus) is a species of megabat in the family Pteropodidae. It is endemic to Indonesia, and has three subspecies:
C. t.  major
C. t.  terminus
C. t. titthaecheilus

References

Cynopterus
Bats of Indonesia
Least concern biota of Asia
Mammals described in 1825
Taxonomy articles created by Polbot
Taxa named by Coenraad Jacob Temminck